1852 in archaeology

Explorations

Excavations
 January - Excavations of the royal palace at Dur-Sharrukin are resumed by Victor Place.
 Excavations at Nineveh are continued by H. C. Rawlinson.
 Excavations at Babylon by Julius Oppert begin.
 Excavations in the Nile Valley by Hekekyan Bey begin.

Finds
 Antique-collecting grave robbers dig up the bones of Lilias Adie who died in 1704 in custody under investigation for witchcraft at Torryburn, Scotland.
 In May, excavations by Charles Ernest Beulé on the Acropolis of Athens discover the remains of the Beulé Gate.

Publications
 William Michael Wylie - Fairford Graves: a record of researches in an Anglo-Saxon burial place in Gloucestershire.

Births
 March 30 - James Theodore Bent, English explorer, archaeologist and author (died 1897).

Deaths
 March 5 - Bernardino Drovetti, Piedmontese antiquarian and Egyptologist (born 1776).
 October 13 - John Lloyd Stephens, American explorer of Maya civilization sites in Mesoamerica (born 1805).

See also
 List of years in archaeology
 1851 in archaeology
 1853 in archaeology

References

Archaeology
Archaeology by year
Archaeology
Archaeology